Asko Peltoniemi (born 7 February 1963 in Ikaalinen) is a retired Finnish pole vaulter, now is Fitness Coach from FC Haka.

Achievements

1963 births
Living people
People from Ikaalinen
Finnish male pole vaulters
Athletes (track and field) at the 1988 Summer Olympics
Athletes (track and field) at the 1992 Summer Olympics
Olympic athletes of Finland
Sportspeople from Pirkanmaa